Footprints on the Moon ("The Footprints"), also released as Primal Impulse, is a 1975 Italian mystery thriller film starring Florinda Bolkan and Klaus Kinski. It concerns a translator with an unexplained two-day gap in her memory that follows clues to a seaside town for answers, where the unfamiliar residents seem to recognize her.

Plot
Alice Cespi, living alone in Rome and employed as an interpreter, wakes up to find she has lost several days. Tormented by a recurrent nightmare from a film she saw when young called "Footprints on the Moon", in which an astronaut is left to die on the Moon by an evil mission controller. She has become reliant on tranquilisers. Going in to work, she is fired for being absent without explanation.

Back in her apartment she finds a postcard showing a faded old hotel at a place called Garma. She finds a bloodstained yellow dress she has never seen before hanging up in her closet, and notices that she has lost an earring. She decides to go to Garma, a Turkish island, and books into the mostly empty hotel. People there say they saw her a few days ago, but she had long red hair. In a shop she sees an identical yellow dress to the one she found. A dog in the woods is playing with a long red wig. She begins to suspect that the missing days in her life may indeed have been on Garma.

In a panic in the woods, she falls unconscious and a man called Henry carries her to an empty villa. When she comes to, she recognises the distinctive stained glass windows showing peacocks. On the bathroom floor she finds her missing earring. In her jumbled memories, Harry was a lover who left her, just as the astronaut was left, and in revenge she stabbed him with scissors (hence the bloodstains on the yellow dress).

She hears Harry talking on the telephone and, suspicious that he is arranging to have her taken away, kills him with a pair of scissors. Pursued along the beach by the psychiatric nurses he had called, she sees them as astronauts sent by the evil controller. An end title says she is in a secure hospital.

Cast
 Florinda Bolkan as Alice Cespi
 Peter McEnery as Henry
 Lila Kedrova as Mrs Heim
 Nicoletta Elmi as Paula Burton
 Klaus Kinski as Blackmann
 Caterina Boratto as Boutique owner
 Evelyn Stewart as Mary 
 Esmeralda Ruspoli
 John Karlsen as Alfred Lowenthal
 Rosita Torosh as Marie Leblanche

Production
The film's script was allegedly based on Las Huellas by Italian-Argentinian writer Mario Fenelli. He was close friends with Manuel Puig with the two writing scripts together while Puig encouraged Fenelli to become a fiction writer instead of a film-maker. The film was shot in nine weeks between Rome and Turkey starting on 29 April 1974. Florinda Bolkan spoke on her performance in the film stating that she was immersed into it psychologically and physically stating she lost eleven pounds while working on it. the film was director Luigi Bazzoni's final film.

Release
Footprints on the Moon was distributed by Cineriz in Italy as Le orme on 1 February 1975. The film grossed a total of 202,505,676 Italian lire domestically.

Reception
On its initial release, critic Giovanni Grazzini wrote that "following Dario Argento's exploits, Italian cinema can count on another director who knows how to make a thriller...The movie nails you to the chair, keeps you awake, sows in doubt and curiosity, and eventually does not make you regret the time and money spent."

Francesco Barilli saw the film in 2011 and referred to it as an "intriguing, elegant, suggestive film, very courageous and peculiar, very well shot and with a beautiful photography by Vittorio Storaro"

References

Footnotes

Sources

External links

1975 films
Italian mystery thriller films
1970s Italian-language films
Films directed by Luigi Bazzoni
Films scored by Nicola Piovani
1970s Italian films